{{Infobox medical condition (new) 
| name            = Clear-cell adenocarcinoma of the vagina (and/or cervix)
| image           =  
| caption         =  
| 
| pronounce       =  
| field           =  oncology/gynecology
| synonyms        =  
| symptoms        = 
| complications   = 
| onset           = 
| duration        = 
| types           = 
| causes          = 
| risks           = 
| diagnosis       = 
| differential    = 
| prevention      = 
| treatment       = 
| medication      = 
| prognosis       = 
| frequency       = 
| deaths          = 
}}Clear-cell adenocarcinoma of the vagina (and/or cervix''') is a rare adenocarcinoma often linked to prenatal exposure to diethylstilbestrol (DES), a drug which was prescribed in high-risk pregnancy.

Presentation
After age 30 it was thought that women exposed prenatally, "DES daughters", were no longer were at risk for the disease, but as they age into their 40s and 50, cases continue to be reported.

According to the Centers for Disease Control and Prevention (CDC), DES daughters should have a pap/pelvic exam every year because of their lifelong risk for clear-cell adenocarcinoma.

Diagnosis
Clear-cell adenocarcinoma of the vagina is a rare cancer, occurring in up to 10% of primary vaginal malignancies. It is all but confirmed if maternal use of DES is established. Even though it was once thought to no longer occur past the age of 30, it is still seen into the 40s and 50s. Some of the main signs and symptoms for clear-cell adenocarcinoma of the vagina are spotting between menstrual cycles, bleeding post-menopause, abnormal bleeding, and malignant pericardial effusion or cardiac tamponade.

Treatment
Low grade cancer is treated by surgical resection. High grade will require neoadjuvant chemotherapy and resection. Long-term surveillance will be required.

History
The synthetic estrogen DES was given to millions of pregnant women in the United States and other countries. Use in the US was primarily from 1938 to 1971 but not limited to those years. Internationally, DES use continued until the early 1980s. DES was given if a woman had a previous miscarriage, diabetes, or a pregnancy with bleeding, threatened miscarriage or premature labor.

Up until the mid to late 1950s some women were given DES shots. After that, DES was primarily prescribed in pill form. DES also was included in some prenatal vitamins.

In the late 1960s through 1971 a cluster of young women, from their teens into their twenties, was mysteriously diagnosed with clear-cell adenocarcinomac (CCA), a cancer not generally found in women until after menopause. Doctors at Massachusetts General Hospital eventually linked DES exposure before birth to the development of CCA in these young women. They determined the risk for developing CCA among DES daughters is estimated at 1 in a 1,000.

See also
Glassy-cell carcinoma of the cervix
Vaginal melanoma

References

Gynaecological cancer
Rare cancers